Madness and Civilization: A History of Insanity in the Age of Reason (French: Folie et Déraison: Histoire de la folie à l'âge classique, 1961) is an examination by Michel Foucault of the evolution of the meaning of madness in the cultures and laws, politics, philosophy, and medicine of Europe—from the Middle Ages until the end of the 18th century—and a critique of the idea of history and of the historical method. 

Although he uses the language of phenomenology to describe the influence of social structures in the history of the Othering of insane people from society, Madness and Civilization is Foucault's philosophic progress from phenomenology toward something like structuralism (a label Foucault himself always adamantly rejected).

Background
Philosopher Michel Foucault developed Madness and Civilization from his earlier works in the field of psychology, his personal psychological difficulties, and his professional experiences working in a mental hospital. He wrote the book between 1955–1959, when he worked cultural-diplomatic and educational posts in Poland and Germany, as well as in Sweden as director of a French cultural centre at the University of Uppsala.

Summary

In Madness and Civilization, Foucault traces the cultural evolution of the concept of insanity (madness) in three phases: 

 the Renaissance;
 the Classical Age; and
 the Modern era

Renaissance 
In the Renaissance, art portrayed insane people as possessing wisdom (knowledge of the limits of the world), whilst literature portrayed the insane as people who reveal the distinction between what men are and what men pretend to be. Renaissance art and literature further depicted insane people as intellectually engaged with reasonable people, because their madness represented the mysterious forces of cosmic tragedy. Yet Renaissance intellectualism began to develop an objective way of thinking about and describing reason and unreason, compared with the subjective descriptions of madness from the Middle Ages.

Neo Classical Age 
At the dawn of the Age of Reason in the 17th century, there occurred "the Great Confinement" of insane people in the countries of Europe; the initial management of insane people was to segregate them to the margins of society, and then to physically separate them from society by confinement, with other anti-social people (prostitutes, vagrants, blasphemers, et al.) into new institutions, such as the General Hospital of Paris. Christian European society perceived such anti-social people as being in moral error, for having freely chosen lives of prostitution, vagrancy, blasphemy, unreason, etc. To revert such moral errors, society's new institutions to confine outcast people featured way-of-life regimes composed of punishment-and-reward programs meant to compel the inmates to choose to reverse their choices of lifestyle.

The socio-economic forces that promoted this institutional confinement included the legalistic need for an extrajudicial social mechanism with the legal authority to physically separate socially undesirable people from mainstream society; and for controlling the wages and employment of poor people living in workhouses, whose availability lowered the wages of freeman workers. The conceptual distinction, between the mentally insane and the mentally sane, was a social construct produced by the practices of the extrajudicial separation of a human being from free society to institutional confinement. In turn, institutional confinement conveniently made insane people available to medical doctors then beginning to view madness as a natural object of study, and then as an illness to be cured.

Modern era 
The Modern era began at the end of the 18th century, with the creation of medical institutions for confining mentally insane people under the supervision of medical doctors. Those institutions were product of two cultural motives: (i) the new goal of curing the insane away from poor families; and (ii) the old purpose of confining socially undesirable people to protect society. Those two, distinct social purposes soon were forgotten, and the medical institution became the only place for the administration of therapeutic treatments for madness. Although nominally more enlightened in scientific and diagnostic perspective, and compassionate in the clinical treatment of insane people, the modern medical institution remained as cruelly controlling as were mediaeval treatments for madness. In the preface to the 1961 edition of Madness and Civilization, Foucault said that:

Reception

In the critical volume, Foucault (1985), the philosopher José Guilherme Merquior said that the value of Madness and Civilization as intellectual history was diminished by errors of fact and of interpretation that undermine Foucault's thesis—how social forces determine the meanings of madness and society's responses to the mental disorder of the person. Specifically problematic was his selective citation of data, which ignored contradictory historical evidence of preventive imprisonment and physical cruelty towards insane people during the historical periods when Foucault said society perceived the mad as wise people—institutional behaviors allowed by the culture of Christian Europeans who considered madness worse than sin. Nonetheless, Merquior said that, like the book Life Against Death (1959), by Norman O. Brown, Foucault's book about Madness and Civilization is "a call for the liberation of the Dionysian id"; and gave inspiration for Anti-Oedipus: Capitalism and Schizophrenia (1972), by the philosopher Gilles Deleuze and the psychoanalyst Félix Guattari.

In his 1994 essay "Phänomenologie des Krankengeistes" ('Phenomenology of the Sick Spirit'), philosopher Gary Gutting said:[T]he reactions of professional historians to Foucault's Histoire de la folie [1961] seem, at first reading, ambivalent, not to say polarized. There are many acknowledgements of its seminal role, beginning with Robert Mandrou's early review in [the Annales d'Histoire Economique et Sociale], characterizing it as a 'beautiful book' that will be 'of central importance for our understanding of the Classical period.' Twenty years later, Michael MacDonald confirmed Mandrou's prophecy: 'Anyone who writes about the history of insanity in early modern Europe must travel in the spreading wake of Michael Foucault's famous book, Madness and Civilization.’Later endorsements included Jan Goldstein, who said, "For both their empirical content and their powerful theoretical perspectives, the works of Michel Foucault occupy a special and central place in the historiography of psychiatry;" and Roy Porter, "Time has proved Madness and Civilization [to be by] far the most penetrating work ever written on the history of madness." However, despite Foucault being herald of 'the new cultural history', there was much criticism.

In Psychoanalysis and Male Homosexuality (1995), Kenneth Lewes said that Madness and Civilization is an example of the "critique of the institutions of psychiatry and psychoanalysis" that occurred as part of the "general upheaval of values in the 1960s." That the history Foucault presents in Madness and Civilization is similar to, but more profound than The Myth of Mental Illness (1961) by Thomas Szasz.

See also

 Anti-psychiatry
 Cogito and the History of Madness
The Archaeology of Knowledge

Notes

References

External links
Some images and paintings that appear in the book

1961 non-fiction books
Anti-psychiatry books
French-language books
French non-fiction books
Books about mental health
Plon (publisher) books
Books about social history
Works by Michel Foucault